Nushki District (locally known as Noshkay نوشکے) is one of the  districts of Balochistan province, Pakistan. The administration of the Nushki district was taken over from the Khan of Kalat by the British government in 1896, and was leased from him on a perpetual quit rent in 1899.

Etymology 
Nushki drew from two Balochi words "Nosh-Koh" which stands for finishing work. In fact from 852 till 1764,  the ancient Baloch tribe Mandai was ruling over Nushki. In 1546-47, Mandai along with Rakhshani tribes including Jamaldini, Hooth, Badini, Jeehandzai, Makaki, Lajahi and Badozai fought against Kamran Mirza the brother of Humayun, where they defeated Mughals under the leading of Mir Mandai Khan and Mir Bijar Khan. When they came back from battle field, people asked them "What happened? They answered, we finished them", means (Nosh-Koh) with the passage of time, this word converted in "Nushki".

History 
Mandai tribe ruled over Nushki for approximately 1000 years. In 1763-64, Mir Naseer Khan Noori was leaving for Mashahad, Iran to help Ahmed Shah Durrani against Persians. When he arrived Nushki, where Rakhshani tribes welcomed him, and served him for 25 days. Before leaving for Mashahad, he asked Mandai the leading tribe and other Rakhshanis to help him in Mashahad war. Mandqi's Sardar refused and other Rakhshanis as well, beside of Jeehandzai tribe. Therefore, Naseer Khan used force against them and killed many of them. Nominated Jeehandzai as chief of Rakhshan. In short, Mandai was the tribe, who ruled Nushki, Garam sail, Showrawak and Chaghi around 1000 years. But their own Baloch brothers (Noori Naseer Khan) demolished their kingdom.

Demographics
At the time of the 2017 census the district had a population of 178,947, of which 92,571 were males and 86,373 females. Rural population was 132,551 (74.07%) while the urban population was 46,396 (25.93%). The literacy rate was 51.67% - the male literacy rate was 63.99% while the female literacy rate was 38.45%. Islam is the predominant religion with 99.36% while Hindus are 0.56% of the population.

At the time of the 2017 census, 60.13% of the population spoke Brahui, 32.41% Balochi and 6.23% Pashto as their first language.

The following tribes are found in the district:

Administrative divisions 
Nushki District has only one teshil: Nushki Tehsil; which is further sub-divided into eight union councils: Mengal, Badini Kashingi, Anam Bostan, Dak, Jamaldini, Ahmedwal, Mal, M/C Noshki

References

Bibliography 
District Gazetteer 1905

External links

Nushki District Development Profile
 Nushki District at www.balochistan.gov.pk

 
Districts of Pakistan
Districts of Balochistan, Pakistan